The 1973 Press-on-Regardless Rally (formally the 25th Press-on-Regardless Rally) was the eleventh round of the inaugural World Rally Championship season.  Run at the outset of November in Michigan in the United States, the rally was run entirely on gravel.

Report 
Due to a combination of scheduling and location, the event was not attended by most European competitors. Giving teams only two weeks following the preceding Sanremo Rally to travel across the Atlantic Ocean, and then giving even less time for a return to Europe for the following RAC Rally in England, proved unrealistic for most teams, and in the event, only a few teams from Poland made the trip with their domestic Polski Fiat 125p vehicles. As it turned out, the event was primarily a local affair, with a Canadian, Walter Boyce, taking the win ahead of a field of American drivers.

In 1973, and for several years afterward, only manufacturers were given points for finishes in WRC events. With the teams focused on the prestigious RAC Rally upcoming, and with the year's championship already sewn up by Alpine Renault, the works teams did not make an effort to compete in the American leg of the championship. Toyota became the beneficiary as it was a Corolla that carried Boyce to victory, while other makes popular on the North American market filled out the ranks. Datsuns were particularly prevalent—especially the locally popular Datsun 510—and Polski Fiat was rewarded for their effort in making the trip by a finish in the points, but overall, the results factored little into the factory efforts for the championship.

Results 

Source: Independent WRC archive

Championship standings after the event

References

External links 
 Official website of the World Rally Championship
 1973 Press-on-Regardless Rally at Rallye-info 

Press-on-Regardless
Motorsport in Michigan
1973 in American motorsport